Darren Ryan (born 3 July 1972) is an English former footballer.

Career

Ryan began his professional career with Shrewsbury Town, as he progressed through the youth system and made four Football League appearances for them from 1990 to 1992. He later had two spells with Chester City and also played for Stockport County and Rochdale before drifting out of the English Football League in 1996. He has since become an established figure in Welsh football, through clubs including a successful period with professional club Barry Town and later Total Network Solutions and Newtown. He replaced his former Chester teammate Roger Preece as Newtown manager in October 2006. He remained with the club for four years, stepping down in August 2010. He joined Airbus UK as manager in March 2011 before returning to Newtown in June, but quit after just seventeen days in charge to become First Team Coach at Northwich Victoria.

He resigned from the club on 16 January 2012 along with the rest of Andy Preece's management, with the club reporting that Preece was expected to be appointed Director of Football at Welsh Premier League side Airbus UK Broughton the next day. The next day he was appointed as Head Coach at Airbus UK.

Ryan now works for Wolverhampton Wanderers training youngsters and his currently coaches the clubs under 23s.

References

External links

Welsh Premier profile
Newtown website profile

1972 births
Living people
Sportspeople from Oswestry
English footballers
Association football midfielders
Shrewsbury Town F.C. players
Chester City F.C. players
Stockport County F.C. players
Rochdale A.F.C. players
Barry Town United F.C. players
Merthyr Tydfil F.C. players
Newport County A.F.C. players
Carmarthen Town A.F.C. players
Haverfordwest County A.F.C. players
Cardiff Grange Harlequins A.F.C. players
Newtown A.F.C. players
English Football League players
Cymru Premier players
English football managers
The New Saints F.C. players
Newtown A.F.C. managers
Airbus UK Broughton F.C. managers
Cymru Premier managers